The Polish Cup is the annual national ice hockey cup competition in Poland.

Editions

Note: Cup was not contested between 1972–1999

References
 Polish Cup
 Polish Ice Hockey Federation

Cup
National ice hockey cup competitions in Europe